Eshpum ( esh18-pum, formerly read Geba) was Akkadian Governor of Elam around 2269–2255 BCE. He was a vassal of the Akkadian Empire ruler Manishtushu.

While Eshpum was in charge of Elam, another Governor of Manistushu named Ilshu-rabi was in charge of Pashime, in the coastal area.

Votive statue
An archaic statue of an orant is known, which was re-dedicated about 500 years later by Eshpum. It reads:

Seal inscriptions

"Eshpum, Governor of Elam"
Another inscription of Eshpum is known, which reads "Eshpum, Governor of Elam" ( esz18-pum ensi2 elam{ki}).

"Egigi, servant of Eshpum"
A seal only known from fragments, was made in the name of "Egigi, the fortune teller, servant of Eshpum".

References

Elamite people
Elamite kings
23rd-century BC rulers
Awan Dynasty